Todd Duncan is a retired American soccer defender who spent two seasons in the USL A-League.

Duncan graduated from Bellarmine High School.  He attended San Jose State University as a two-sport athlete in baseball and soccer.  His soccer skills brought him to the attention of the San Jose Clash who selected him in the third round (27th overall) of the 1999 MLS College Draft.  The San Francisco Bay Seals also drafted Duncan, in the 1999 USL A-League draft. Duncan signed with the Seals and played for them in 1999 and 2000.

References

1977 births
Living people
American baseball players
American soccer players
Bay Area Seals players
San Jose State Spartans baseball players
San Jose State Spartans men's soccer players
A-League (1995–2004) players
San Jose Earthquakes draft picks
Association football defenders